Macroglossum hirundo is a moth of the  family Sphingidae. It is known from the Cook Islands, Fiji, the Society Islands, Australia (the Northern Territory, Queensland and New South Wales), Papua New Guinea, the Bismarck Archipelago and the Solomon Islands.

The wingspan is about 40 mm. Adults have light and dark brown forewings, with a pale bar across the middle of each. The hindwings are yellow with a broad black border.

They larvae feed on various Rubiaceae species, including Canthium odoratum, Coelospermum reticulatum, Coprosma repens, Morinda jasminoides, Myrmecodia beccarii, Pavetta australiensis and Psychotria loniceroides. The larvae are initially green with a black forward curving spine on the tail. Later, they can become pale brown or green, covered in small white dots. There is a dark dorsal line which may be fragmented into a line of dashes. A pair of pale dorso-lateral lines run from the head to the tail.

Subspecies
Macroglossum hirundo hirundo
Macroglossum hirundo errans Walker, 1856 (Papua New Guinea)
Macroglossum hirundo lifuensis Rothschild, 1894 (New Caledonia)

References

Macroglossum
Moths described in 1832